"Solace of You" is a song by the funk metal band Living Colour from their album Time's Up released in 1990.

Charts

References

Living Colour songs
1990 singles
Songs written by Vernon Reid
Songs written by Corey Glover
Song recordings produced by Ed Stasium
1990 songs
Epic Records singles
Calypso songs